The Xiamafang Ruins Park is located at the southern foot of Purple Mountain in Xuanwu District, Nanjing.

The name of the park comes from the Ming Tomb. The Ming Tomb is the tomb burying Ming Taizu and his queen together. Ming Taizu appointed Xiaoling Guard (a military guard institution protecting the Ming Tomb professionally) there to garrison it from interference. In ancient times, officials coming here to call on the Ming Tomb were required to dismount in order to keep the tomb solemn and respectful. As a result, the park got its name. Consequently, Xiamafang is the starting point of the Ming Tomb.

The park opened to the public since the National Day in 2007. 600 years ago, the area was a forbidden territory. Stationed there were 5600 royal soldiers selected by Ming Taizu to guard the catacomb truthfully for himself. Visitors can find the signs of the history of the Xiaoling Guard everywhere in the park. As it were, the park is the essence of evaporation of the history.

Transportation
Xiamafang station on Line 2 of the Nanjing Metro is located to the southeast of the park.

Buildings and structures in Nanjing
Parks in Nanjing